80's Ladies is the debut studio album by American country music artist K. T. Oslin. It was released by RCA Records in July 1987. "Wall of Tears", the title track, "Do Ya'" and "I'll Always Come Back" were released as singles. The album reached #1 on the Top Country Albums chart and has been certified Platinum by the RIAA.

Track listing

Personnel
Adapted from liner notes.

K. T. Oslin – keyboards, lead vocals, backing vocals
David Briggs – keyboards 
Gary Prim – keyboards
Costo Davis – synthesizer
Bruce Dees – electric guitar
Steve Gibson – electric guitar
Brent Rowan – acoustic guitar, electric guitar
Mike Brignardello – bass guitar
Larry Paxton – bass guitar
Eddie Bayers – drums
Larrie Londin – drums
James Stroud – drums
Sam Levine – saxophone
Terry McMillan – harmonica
Joe Scaife – backing vocals

Production
Harold Shedd - producer
Jim Cotton - recording, engineering, associate producer
Joe Scaife - recording, engineering, associate producer
George W. Clinton - assistant engineer
Paul Goldberg - assistant engineer
Milan Bogdan - digital editing
Hank Williams - mastering

Chart positions

References

1987 debut albums
K. T. Oslin albums
RCA Records albums
Albums produced by Harold Shedd